Anthony Middleton (born 22 September 1980) is a British adventurer, writer, television personality and former UK Special Forces soldier, Royal Marines Commando, and Royal Engineer in the British Army. He is best known as the former Chief Instructor on the Channel 4 television series SAS: Who Dares Wins, a role he held from 2015 until 2021. Middleton also appeared as the Captain in the adventure/reality-show Mutiny and the survival show Escape. In 2018 he climbed Everest for the TV show Extreme Everest with Ant Middleton.

Career

Military service 
Middleton joined the army in 1998 at the age of 17 where he served in the 9 Parachute Squadron RE and served tours of duty in Northern Ireland in 1999 and Macedonia in 2001. After leaving the army he later enlisted in the Royal Marines on 2nd may 2005. He passed the 32 week commando course on 20th Jan 2006 with 898 troop, winning the King's Badge for best all round recruit, and was posted to D Company, 40 Commando. In 2007 he did his first tour in Afghanistan. In 2008 he joined the Special Boat Service, serving for 4 years. After leaving the military, Middleton worked as a security guard for VIPs, and later as a security expert in South Africa and for various West African governments.

Television 
Middleton was the Chief Instructor on SAS: Who Dares Wins, a reality quasi-military training television programme produced by Channel 4, which was first broadcast in 2015. The show propelled Middleton into celebrity limelight. Mutiny, an adventure/reality crossover show, screened on UK television in February 2017, with Middleton starring as boat captain alongside eight volunteering participants. The show was a re-enactment of the Mutiny on the Bounty and Middleton described the experience as "mentally speaking, the hardest thing I've ever done". In March 2021, Middleton was dropped by Channel 4 over his personal conduct.

Publications 
In 2017, Middleton co-authored his first book, SAS: Who Dares Wins: Leadership Secrets from the Special Forces, with his fellow TV presenters and Special Forces colleagues Jason Fox, Matthew "Ollie" Ollerton and Colin Maclachlan. Middleton's autobiography, First Man In: Leading from the Front, was published in 2018, becoming a Number 1 Sunday Times best-seller. His second book, The Fear Bubble: Harness Fear and Live Without Limits, was published in 2019, and was also No.1 on The Sunday Times best-seller chart. His third book, Zero Negativity, was published in 2020. Ant features in Coach Mike Chadwick's audiobook The Red On Revolution, published in 2022.

Other 
On 14 May 2018, Middleton summited Mount Everest with Ed Wardle, completing the climb over a five and a half week period. The pair nearly died when they were caught in a blizzard behind a group of ten climbers who hampered their progress during the descent.

In November 2019 Middleton was appointed as Chief Cadet and Honorary Captain in the Royal Navy's Volunteer Cadet Corps. He left the position nine months later amidst controversy surrounding a comment he made on Twitter, which appeared to compare Black Lives Matter protesters with the English Defence League as extremists and "scum", though he later said he was not equating the two groups.

Personal life 
Middleton was born in Portsmouth, Hampshire, and brought up in France.

Middleton was convicted of the unlawful wounding of one police officer and common assault upon a second in 2013. He was sentenced to 14 months in prison, of which he served four months.

Filmography

Television

Live Tours

Works

Non-fiction
SAS: Who Dares Wins: Leadership Secrets from the Special Forces (Headline, 2016) 
Leader et soldat d'élite: Leçons des forces spéciales (Talent Editions, 2019) 
Mental Fitness: 15 Rules to Strengthen Your Body and Mind (HarperCollins, 2021) 
Mission: Total Resilence (Red Shed, 2022) 
The Wall (HarperCollins, 2022) 
Mission: Total Confidence (Red Shed, 2023)

The Mindset Trilogy
First Man In: Leading from the Front (HarperCollins, 2018) 
The Fear Bubble: Harness Fear and Live Without Limits (HarperCollins, 2019) 
Zero Negativity: The Power of Positive Thinking (HarperCollins, 2020)

Fiction
Cold Justice (Sphere, 2021) 
Red Mist (Sphere, 2023) 
Medals/Awards

References

External links 

 

1980 births
Living people
Military personnel from Portsmouth
Male actors from Portsmouth
English expatriates in France
Royal Engineers soldiers
21st-century Royal Marines personnel
Special Boat Service personnel
Royal Navy personnel of the War in Afghanistan (2001–2021)
British military personnel of the Sierra Leone Civil War
English television personalities
British summiters of Mount Everest
Royal Marines ranks